Julia Lockheart  is a British artist, academic and researcher.

She currently works as a metadesign researcher and Associate Lecturer in Design Writing at Goldsmiths, University of London; as a Senior Lecturer, Head of Contextual Practices, and Director of the Metadesign Research Centre (MRC) at Swansea College of Art, University of Wales Trinity Saint David; and also as a design and language consultant to several educational institutions internationally.

Education 

Lockheart was awarded her Ph.D from the Design Department of Goldsmiths, University of London, in 2016. Her thesis was on the subject of collaborative writing as a tool for design teams at Master's degree-level in higher education. She holds a Master of Arts (MA) in Teaching English as a second or foreign language (TESOL) from the Institute of Education, University of London. and an MA in Fine Art from Manchester Metropolitan University. She completed her Bachelor of Arts (BA, Honours) in Fine Art from Saint Martins School of Art, University of the Arts London; and her Foundation Diploma in Art and Design at the Stourbridge School of Art, Design and Technology. She also holds a Certificate in Teaching Learners with Specific Learning Difficulties (Dyslexia) from OCR at University College London's Centre for Human Communication; and an Adult Education Teaching Certificate in English as a second or foreign language (EFL) at Morley College in London.

Career 
Julia Lockheart is a British artist and university academic. Her artistic practice concerns the depiction of dreams in artworks that then enable the sharing of the dream with others. This has led to research on the relationship of sharing dreams to empathy. Her other research strand focuses on writing in art and design, for which she is the co-founder and Director of the Writing-PAD network and co-founder and co-editor of the Journal of Writing in Creative Practice (published by Intellect Books).

She currently works as a metadesign researcher and Associate Lecturer in Design Writing at Goldsmiths, University of London; as a Senior Lecturer, Head of Contextual Practices, and Director of the Metadesign Research Centre (MRC) at Swansea College of Art, University of Wales Trinity Saint David; and also as a design and language consultant to several educational institutions internationally.

Lockheart is a member of the National Association of Writers in Education, the Staff and Educational Development Association, 
and The Idries Shah Foundation, formerly The Institute for Cultural Research; Fellow of the Royal Society of Arts, and Senior Fellow of the Higher Education Academy.

The Coldstream Reports 
In 2018, Lockheart published an important academic paper, "The importance of writing as a material practice for art and design students: A contemporary rereading of the Coldstream Reports".

William Coldstream was an English realist painter and art teacher, and from 1959 he was Chairman of the National Advisory Council on Art Education. In 1960, the council published its first report, named after Coldstream, which proposed and set out requirements for a new Diploma in Art and Design (Dip.A.D.), such as written essays and written examinations, and "helped to change the structure of art school teaching in Britain".

According to the study carried out by Lockheart, and her own experience as a practitioner or studio artist – rather than a theorist – however, the recommendation of academic writing for practitioners contained in the Coldstream Reports were misread and, as a result, strong and – according to Lockheart, unfounded – beliefs were formed among academics and those in managerial positions throughout the Higher Education (HE) sector.

Lockheart posits that "upholding these institutional assumptions may have an impact on how writing is used as a component of examination and therefore aligned with the need for academic parity across the HE sector, rather than as a tool for understanding
and articulating practice." "As a result," she continues, "this article calls for the reinstatement of a unified HE art and design curriculum to be filled with a diversity of pedagogical [teaching] approaches, including writing practices, that are complementary to and inform the purposes of creative practice."

As a result of this controversial mis-reading of the first report and a later report published in 1970, in 1970 "the Department of Education and Science ... recommended the humanities style academic thesis or dissertation as a part of the move from the [old] Diploma in Design to ..." the new Diploma in Art and Design (Dip.A.D.), and these mis-readings have "caused writing to be used as an examinable measure rather than as a tool for learning", to its detriment.

Academic literacies 
In a paper co-written with G. Melles in 2012, titled "Writing PAD: Writing purposefully in art and design: Responding to converging and diverging new academic literacies", Lockheart argues that while academic literacies and writing practices are well-established in older, traditional academic disciplines, more recent disciplines such as art and design have been forced to adopt these existing academic practices or to justify their own distinctive practices, and this has been a contentious issue in the discipline of art and design (which includes diverse fields, each with their differences and their own requirements, such as fine art, graphic design and fashion design).

It is in this spirit that Lockheart teaches Contextual Practice, and primarily for this reason that she co-founded an academic network, Writing-PAD, to provide a platform for these new ideas and practices (see below).

Writing-PAD and Journal of Writing in Creative Practice 
Lockheart is also director and co-ordinator of Writing-PAD – short for Writing Purposefully in Art and Design – an online academic and research network connecting over 100 institutions.

Writing-PAD grew out of Lockheart's interest in a correct interpretation and implementation of the Coldsteam Reports and in academic literacies, and was specifically set-up "to support and disseminate the range of genres associated with writing in art and design;" and also "to promote discussion about the necessary balance of consensus and dissensus that art and design fields require to remain vibrant."

Lockheart is also co-editor of the Journal of Writing in Creative Practice, which she co-founded with Goldsmiths' Emeritus Professor and University of Wales Trinity Saint David's Professor of Practice, John Wood. The JWCP, too, grew out of the contentious re-reading of the Coldstream Reports, and also out of the Writing-PAD international network, and is its "published voice" – as did the later project "DreamsID" (see below).

DreamsID 
DreamsID (short for "Dreams Illustrated and Discussed" or "Dreams Interpreted and Drawn") is a practical, collaborative project between Lockheart and research psychologist, Professor Mark Blagrove.

They hold 60 – 90 minute sessions with the dream subject and an invited audience, and while the subject shares their dream, with Blagrove helping to facilitate and visualize the dream narrative, Lockheart draws and paints the dream, in real-time, on a torn-out page from Sigmund Freud's book, The Interpretation of Dreams, to create "a tapestry of elements, plot, metaphoric imagery, and Freud's words." This follows a Dadaist and Surrealist performance aesthetic (Lockheart et al., 2021). Then, later in the session, the audience is invited to join in the discussion, referencing the dream to waking life, according to the method devised by psychiatrist Montague Ullman.

In the course of the sessions, Lockheart and Blagrove began to notice that the sharing of the dreams and the discussions were having an effect not only on them but on some of the audience, and that the sessions were invoking empathy toward the subjects sharing their dreams. As a result of this, the collaborators went on to co-author an important scientific paper, "Testing the Empathy Theory of Dreaming: The Relationships Between Dream Sharing and Trait and State Empathy", which was later published in Frontiers in Psychology.

In April 2019, the BBC World Service Television programme CrowdScience broadcast a segment in which Lockheart is shown painting as a candidate shares her dream.

In April 2020, Lockheart's artwork was featured in a New Scientist article on how the COVID-19 pandemic was affecting people's dreams.

In October 2020 and January 2021, Lockheart and Blagrove held online events to commemorate the 120th anniversaries of Sigmund Freud's patient Dora telling two dreams to Freud. The first dream was of being rescued from a burning house by her father, the second was of travelling to her father's funeral. The aim of the events was to discuss with expert panel and worldwide audience how Dora’s two dreams could be related to her distressing family circumstances. The two dreams were painted by Lockheart during the discussions.

Selected publications
Lockheart has published several papers in academic and research journals, given a number of conference presentations, and held many workshops.

She has also given numerous public performances, on subjects such as dreams and nightmares, and her interpretations of the neurologist and psychoanalyst Sigmund Freud's book, The Interpretation of Dreams, and drawn and painted dream interpretations in real-time for the "DreamsID" project (above).

Books 
   (Hardcover),  (Paperback)

Print publications / chapters 
  Chapter 10: Edwards, H. and Lockheart, J. (2013), "Creative Writing and the Other Arts".

  Lockheart, J., Gamble, M., Miller, J., Fisher, G., and Henderson, D. (2008), "Practice-based learning and teaching: a real world experience?"

Articles in journals 

 

 

 

 

 

  Paper on the benefits of sharing dreams, given at the 35th annual conference of the International Association for the Study of Dreams, Scottsdale, Arizona, 16–20 June 2018.

  Paper given at the 35th annual conference of the International Association for the Study of Dreams, Scottsdale, Arizona, 16–20 June 2018.

  Online .

 

  Online .

See also 
 Dream interpretation

References

External links 
 Profile at University of Wales Trinity Saint David
 Profile at Goldsmiths, University of London
 
 Julia Lockheart at ResearchGate
 Julia Lockheart at Academia.edu
 Writing-PAD web site
 DreamsID web site
 DreamsID science art collaboration

Living people
Date of birth missing (living people)
Place of birth missing (living people)
Alumni of Saint Martin's School of Art
Alumni of Manchester Metropolitan University
Alumni of the UCL Institute of Education
Alumni of Goldsmiths, University of London
British artists
Academics of the University of Wales Trinity Saint David
Academics of Goldsmiths, University of London
Senior Fellows of the Higher Education Academy
People associated with The Institute for Cultural Research
Year of birth missing (living people)